The Eisner Award for Best Short Story is an award for "creative achievement" in American comic books that has been awarded every year since its creation in 1993. The Eisner Award rules state that "A short story must be within an anthology
of bigger work or else appear online."

Winners and nominees

References

Best Short Story
1993 establishments in the United States
Annual events in the United States
Awards established in 1993
Comics awards
Short Story